Vito Kapo ( Kondi, 11 September 1922 – 29 February 2020) was an Albanian politician who served as Minister of the Light Industry. She was the wife of Hysni Kapo, a member of the Politburo of the Party of Labour of Albania, and a sister of the Albanian World War II hero Alqi Kondi. She was also the President of the Union of Albanian Women for nearly thirty years. Kapo was born in September 1922 in Zagori, Gjirokaster District. She died in February 2020 in Tirane at the age of 97.

In her work as President of the Union of Albanian Women, she stated that the struggle the Party of Labour of Albania was waging for the emancipation of women was a "struggle for the triumph of revolutionary ideology of the working class, and the destruction of the reactionary bourgeois and petit bourgeois ideology."

Sources 

1922 births
2020 deaths
20th-century Albanian politicians
20th-century Albanian women politicians
Industry and mines ministers of Albania
Labour Party of Albania politicians
People from Libohovë
Government ministers of Albania
Women government ministers of Albania
Members of the Parliament of Albania
Women members of the Parliament of Albania